Annette Clarke (born 1983; married name Annette Collins) is an Irish sportswoman. She played ladies' Gaelic football with her local club, Kilkerrin-Clonberne, and with the Galway county team.

Playing career
Clarke won the All-Ireland Junior Ladies' Football Championship with Galway in 2002, and captained Galway to the All-Ireland Senior Ladies' Football Championship in 2004. 

She suffered a near-career-ending injury in 2010 and was dropped from the Galway squad in 2012. Clarke, however, returned to the Galway squad, winning a second All Star in 2013 and captaining her club to a Connacht Ladies Senior Club Football Championship in 2014. She retired in 2016.

She appeared on an episode of Laochra Gael on 17 April 2016.

Personal life
Annette Clarke is a member of Garda Síochána, the Irish police. She is married to Kieran Collins.

References

External links

 

1983 births
Living people
Galway inter-county ladies' footballers
Garda Síochána officers